Davy Oyen (born 17 July 1975) is a Belgian former football defender who ended his football career playing for KVSK United.

He previously played domestically for K.R.C. Genk, K. Sint-Truidense V.V., R.S.C. Anderlecht, K.V.S.K. United Overpelt-Lommel and K.S.V. Roeselare, as well for Dutch club PSV Eindhoven and English club Nottingham Forest.

Personal life
Oyen is the father of the footballer Luca Oyen.

Honours
Genk
Belgian Cup: 1997–98

References

External links 
 
 

1975 births
Living people
Belgian footballers
K.R.C. Genk players
Sint-Truidense V.V. players
PSV Eindhoven players
R.S.C. Anderlecht players
Nottingham Forest F.C. players
K.S.V. Roeselare players
Belgium international footballers
Challenger Pro League players
Belgian Pro League players
Eredivisie players
English Football League players
Belgian expatriate footballers
Expatriate footballers in the Netherlands
Expatriate footballers in England
Association football defenders
People from Zutendaal
Footballers from Limburg (Belgium)